Ignore the White Culture is the fourth studio album by Missing Foundation, released in 1990 by Restless Records.

Track listing

Personnel 
Adapted from Ignore the White Culture liner notes.

Missing Foundation
 Mark Ashwill – drums-metal
 Chris Egan – drums
adam nodelman;- bass
 Florian Langmaack – drums-sax
 Peter Missing – metal-vocals

Production and additional personnel
 Missing Foundation – production
 Jim Waters – production

Release history

References

External links 
 Ignore the White Culture at Discogs (list of releases)

1990 albums
Missing Foundation albums
Restless Records albums